Paul Joseph "Bucky" McConnell (July 1, 1928 – April 1, 2019) was an American professional basketball player. He played in the National Basketball Association (NBA) for the Milwaukee Hawks in 14 games during the later portion of the 1952–53 season. He averaged 4.9 points, 2.4 rebounds, and 2.9 assists per game. He also played in the Amateur Athletic Union and Eastern Professional Basketball League, the forerunner to the Continental Basketball Association.

In December 1955 he signed with the Hazleton Hawks.

References

External links
Statistics at StatsCrew.com

1928 births
2019 deaths
Amateur Athletic Union men's basketball players
American men's basketball players
Marshall Thundering Herd men's basketball players
Milwaukee Hawks players
Point guards
Undrafted National Basketball Association players